In taxonomy, Methanobacterium is a genus of the Methanobacteriaceae family of Archaea. Despite the name, this genus belongs not to the bacterial domain but the archaeal domain (for instance, they lack peptidoglycan in their cell walls). Methanobacterium are nonmotile and live without oxygen. Some members of this genus can use formate to reduce methane; others live exclusively through the reduction of carbon dioxide with hydrogen. They are ubiquitous in some hot, low-oxygen environments, such as anaerobic digestors, their wastewater, and hot springs.

Examples of Methanobacterium Species 
Methanobacterium bryantii is part of the syntrophic Methanobacillus omelianskii culture.
Methanobacterium thermoautotrophicum Marburg can undergo natural genetic transformation, the transfer of DNA from one cell to another.  Genetic transformation in archaeal species, generally, appears to be an adaptation for repairing DNA damage in a cell by utilizing intact DNA information derived from another cell.

Phylogeny
The currently accepted taxonomy is based on the List of Prokaryotic names with Standing in Nomenclature (LPSN)  and National Center for Biotechnology Information (NCBI).

See also
 List of Archaea genera

References

Further reading

Scientific journals

Scientific databases

External links 

Methanobacterium at BacDive -  the Bacterial Diversity Metadatabase

Archaea genera
Euryarchaeota